Loggerheads, originally titled Zio Adolfo, in arte Führer (literally "Uncle Adolf, AKA Führer") is a 1978 Italian comedy film directed by the duo known as Castellano & Pipolo. It stars singer Adriano Celentano in the dual role of two brothers on opposite fronts during the Nazi Germany.

A parody on the life of Adolf Hitler, Loggerheads is partly a collage film, combining dubbed historical archive footage with similarly-shot original footage of Celentano and other actors.

Plot
In Weimar Germany, twin brothers Hermann and Gustav find themselves on opposite extremes: Hermann is a loyal sympathizer of the emerging Nazi party, and a mediocre illusionist whose every magic trick ends with the death of his assistant; Gustav is an anarchist who prints and spreads anti-Nazi propaganda. With the rise of Adolf Hitler to power, Hermann enlists with the SS and soon becomes a colonel and personal friend of Hitler. Gustav secretly plots and stages several extravagant yet unsuccessful attempts at assassinating Hitler.

As Germany prepares for World War II, many young men enroll into the German army. In Berlin, newly-wed Hans is drafted and separated from his wife Irma on their wedding night. Hermann, aware of his brother's opposition to the Nazi regime but unknowing of his assassination plans, visits Gustav at his hideout. Arguing that fate should decide which of the two ideologies should prevail, Hermann challenges Gustav to a game of Russian roulette. The game, however, goes on indefinitely as the gun never fires and the two brothers keep interrupting and resuming day by day.

After the German defeat in the war and the death of Adolf Hitler, Hermann reprises his activity as an illusionist. Hans returns home and is finally reunited with Irma, but as the couple embrace for the first time in years, they both step on a landmine. Four decades later, the now elderly Hermann and Gustav are still continuing their game of Russian roulette, only to realize the gun had been empty all along.

References

External links

Collage film
Films directed by Castellano & Pipolo
Films scored by Carlo Rustichelli
Italian comedy films
1970s Italian-language films
1978 comedy films
1978 films
1970s Italian films